Christofer Antwone Whitney (born October 5, 1971) is an American former professional basketball player.

Whitney was born in Hopkinsville, Kentucky.  A 6'0" point guard from Lincoln Trail College and then Clemson University, Whitney was selected by the San Antonio Spurs in the second round of the 1993 NBA draft. He played 11 seasons (1993–2004) in the NBA, spending time with the Spurs as well as the Washington Bullets/Wizards, Denver Nuggets, and Orlando Magic.

He finished his NBA career with averages of 6.5 points, 2.8 assists and 1.4 rebounds in 579 games, mostly with the Wizards.  He spent 8 years as the Director of Player Development for the Charlotte Hornets from 2010-2018.

Chris is married to Charlotta Whitney and has 6 children.

External links
NBA.com bio

1971 births
Living people
21st-century African-American sportspeople
African-American basketball players
American men's basketball players
Basketball players from Kentucky
Clemson Tigers men's basketball players
Denver Nuggets players
Florida Beachdogs players
Junior college men's basketball players in the United States
Orlando Magic players
Point guards
Rapid City Thrillers players
San Antonio Spurs draft picks
San Antonio Spurs players
Sportspeople from Hopkinsville, Kentucky
Washington Bullets players
Washington Wizards players
20th-century African-American sportspeople